Ryan Phillips (born 1982) is a Canadian football player.

Ryan Phillips may also refer to:
Ryan Phillips (American football) (born 1974), American football player
Ryan Phillips, musician in Story of the Year